Qulu Qulu (Aymara qulu hump, little hill, the reduplication signifies there is a group or complex of something, "a complex of humps", Hispanicized spelling Colo Colo) is an archaeological site in Peru. It is located in the Puno Region, Sandia Province, Patambuco District. The site was declared a National Cultural Heritage (Patrimonio Cultural) of Peru by the National Institute of Culture.

References 

Archaeological sites in Peru
Archaeological sites in Puno Region